Picus may refer to:
 Picus, a man turned into a woodpecker by Circe in Greek and Roman mythology
 Picus (bird), a genus of birds in the woodpecker family
 Picus, a village in Ochiul Roş Commune, Anenii Noi district, Moldova
 Sue Picus, American bridge player
PICUS, pilot in command under supervision